is a near Earth, Aten asteroid orbiting at nearly a 1:1 resonance with Earth.

Orbit 
With an orbital period of 364.3 days,  is in a near 1:1 orbital resonance with Earth. Although their periods are almost identical, their orbits are very different;  has a highly eccentric orbit and moves between 0.65–1.35 AU from the Sun, it is also very highly inclined at 33°.

 also makes close approaches to Venus and will pass  from Venus on 24 January 2115.

References

External links 
 MPEC 1998-U17
 MPEC 1999-T52
 (85770) = 1998 UP1 Orbit – Minor Planet Center
 
 
 

085770
085770
085770
085770
085770
19981018